Kopalnia  is a village in the administrative district of Gmina Konopiska, within Częstochowa County, Silesian Voivodeship, in southern Poland.

The village has a population of 553.

References

Kopalnia